9 sanningar och en lögn is a studio album by Martin Stenmarck and was released on 25 October 2006.

Track listing
Sjumilakliv - 4:46
Dårarna och jag - 3:40
Ta undulaten - 4:22
Han är galen - 3:27
Ta dom jävlarna - 4:00
Hand i hand - 3:42 (duet with Søs Fenger)
Nästa dans - 3:40
Om du rör mig dör jag - 2:57
Virvelvinden du - 5:27
Hem - 5:16

Contributors
Martin Stenmarck  - vocals
Sebastian Nylund  - guitar
Stefan Olsson  - bass
Peer Åström - drums
Rickard Nilsson  - piano

Charts

Weekly charts

Year-end charts

References

2006 albums
Martin Stenmarck albums
Universal Music Group albums
Swedish-language albums